Playin' Favorites is the fourth studio album by American singer-songwriter Don McLean, released in 1973. It was re-issued by BGO Records in 1995.

Track listing

Side A
"Sitting on Top of the World" (Bo Carter, Little Walter)
"Living With the Blues" (Brownie McGhee)
"Mountains O' Mourne" (Percy French)
"Fool's Paradise" (Sonny LeGlaire, Horace Linsley, Norman Petty)
"Love O' Love" (Traditional; adapted and arranged by Don McLean)
Medley: "Bill Cheetham/Old Joe Clark" (Traditional; adapted and arranged by Don McLean)

Side B
"Everyday" (Charles Hardin, Norman Petty) "Glen D. Hardin" was incorrectly listed on some labels as the songwriter.
"Ancient History" (Irene Stanton, Wayne Walker)
"Over the Mountains" (Irene Stanton, Wayne Walker)
"Lovesick Blues" (Cliff Friend, Irving Mills)
"New Mule Skinner Blues" (Jimmie Rodgers, George Vaughn)
"Happy Trails" (Dale Evans)

Chart positions

Personnel

 Steve Berg – guitar (tracks A1–A2, B4–B5)
 Dave Bromberg – dobro (track B1)
 Buzzy Feiten – tambourine (track A2), guitar (tracks A2, A4)
 John Hughey – pedal steel (track B2)
 Neil Larsen – keyboards (track A4), piano (tracks A3, B1)
 Chuck Leavell – piano (tracks A1–A2, B2, B4–B5)
 Tony Levin – bass (tracks A3–A4, B1–B2)
 Danny Manselino – percussion (track A2)
 Rick Marotta – drums (tracks A1–A2, B2, B4–B5)
 Don McLean – guitar, banjo, vocals
 Frank Orsini – fiddle (tracks A1, B5)
 Rob Rothstein – bass (tracks A1, B4–B5), vocals (tracks A1, B3, B5)
 Johnny Sandlin – percussion (tracks A1, B5)
 Russ Savakus – bass violin (tracks A1–A2, B5)
 Frank Wakefield – mandolin (tracks A1, A6, B4–B6), vocals (tracks A1, B3, B5)
 Ronnie Zito – tambourine (track B1), banjo (track A4)
 Mike Mainieri – marimba (track A4)
 Albertine Robinson – backing vocals (track A2)
 Maretha Stewart – backing vocals (track A2)
 Tasha Thomas – backing vocals (track A2)
Technical
 Ed Freeman – producer
 Frank Hubach – engineer (tracks A2–B3, B6), remixer
 Jim Reeves – engineer (tracks A1, B4–B5)
Mike Salisbury - art direction
Fred Conrad - photography

References

Don McLean albums
1973 albums
United Artists Records albums
Albums recorded at Record Plant (New York City)